On 3 December 2021 unidentified gunmen attacked a bus in Mopti, Central Mali, firing at its occupants and setting it on fire, killing 31 civilians and injuring 17. Most of the passengers were women travelling from Songo-Doubacore to a market in Bandiagara.

According to the local mayor of Bankass, during the massacre, the insurgents slashed the tires, proceeding to shoot the civilians to death, then set the bus on fire. Malian authorities sent a group of state security officers to the crime scene, where they found 25 burnt bodies in the vehicle's trunk.

The massacre occurred on the same day that Islamist rebels attacked a convoy in the region, killing two United Nations peacekeepers. Two days later, unknown militants bombed two UN camps in Gao. The attacks occurred during a recent insurgency among Islamist insurgents in West Africa.

Responses 
President Assimi Goïta ordered all flags in the country to be flown at half-mast from Sunday to Tuesday, during which Mali would hold three national days of mourning.

United States Department of State spokesman Ned Price condemned the attack, expressing that the United States offers its "deepest condolences to the Malian people and will continue to partner with them in their pursuit of a safe, prosperous, and democratic future.”

See also
 List of massacres in Mali

References 

2021 fires in Africa
2021 mass shootings in Africa
Bus massacre
21st-century mass murder in Africa
Arson in Africa
Arson in the 2020s
December 2021 crimes in Africa
December 2021 events in Africa

2021 bus massacre

Massacres in 2021
2021 bus
Mopti Region
Bus massacre
Terrorist incidents on buses in Africa
Vehicle fires